Last of the Mohicans is a 1977 American adventure drama television film based on the novel The Last of the Mohicans by James Fenimore Cooper. The film was directed by James L. Conway, written by Stephen Lord, and stars Steve Forrest, Ned Romero, Andrew Prine, Don Shanks, Michele Marsh, Jane Actman, and Robert Tessier. It was produced by Schick Sunn Classic Pictures as part of their Classics Illustrated series, and aired on NBC on November 23, 1977.

Cast
 Steve Forrest as Hawkeye
 Ned Romero as Chingachgook
 Andrew Prine as Major Heyward
 Don Shanks as Uncas
 Michele Marsh as Cora Munro
 Jane Actman as Alice Munro
 Robert Tessier as Magua
 Robert Easton as David Gamut
 Whit Bissell as General Webb

Production
Parts of the film were shot in Summit County, Utah and Pipe Spring, Arizona.

References

External links
 
 
 

1977 television films
1977 films
1977 drama films
1970s adventure drama films
1970s American films
1970s English-language films
Adventure television films
American adventure drama films
American drama television films
Films based on The Last of the Mohicans
Films directed by James L. Conway
Films set in 1757
Films shot in Arizona
Films shot in Utah
NBC network original films
Television films based on books